Black Market is the eighth studio album by American rapper Rick Ross. The album was released on December 4, 2015, by Maybach Music Group, Slip-n-Slide Records and Def Jam Recordings. The album features guest appearances from John Legend, CeeLo Green, Nas, DJ Premier, Mariah Carey, Mary J. Blige, Chris Brown, Future and The-Dream.

Background
In November 2015, in an interview with Billboard, he spoke about the album, saying: "You know, this album is, I feel like, most definitely gonna be a Rozay on a higher, intellectual level, just discussing a different array of things. When you listen to records like "Foreclosure," that's like me sitting in a room by myself just rapping about things that's running across my mind and things that have been bothering me. And during my incarceration, that was the type of music I created. Just in that short moment of time, I really just sat there... I'm a muthafucka that flies six million miles a year and just to halt one day, out of the blue, for three weeks? It's just, "Woah." There's a lot of shit that I wrote and a lot of shit that I thought about. I came back out and scrapped a lot of music and I recorded some dope songs, but my first day home I recorded six records. So that's why I was able to put out the Black Dollar record and have been releasing a slew of freestyles, just feeding the fans and everybody that's been asking for that Rozay music."

Singles
The album's lead single, "Foreclosures" was released on September 23, 2015. The album's second single, "Sorry" was released on October 9, 2015. The song features guest vocals from American recording artist Chris Brown and is produced by Scott Storch. On November 12, 2015, the music video was released for "Sorry".

Critical reception

Black Market received generally positive reviews from music critics. At Metacritic, which assigns a normalized rating out of 100 to reviews from mainstream critics, the album received an average score of 61, based on 9 reviews, which indicates "generally positive reviews". David Jeffries of AllMusic said, "This Miami Don remains an unapologetic and indefensible brute -- and he says as much on this very LP -- but this rough, honest, and ambitious work is like his Raging Bull, taking the listener on a compelling, dirty journey that's also a connectable character study, and then letting some slick Chris Brown ("Sorry") and Future ("D.O.P.E") features play while the credits roll." Scott Glaysher of HipHopDX said, "All in all, Black Market does its job. It doesn’t hit as hard as some previous albums, but it surely proves just how good Rick Ross can be as a songwriter and collaborator. It also proves how sharp he has become as a rapper. There may not be a thundering single that the album is built around, but, for the most part, Ross’s consistency fills that gap quite nicely." Julian Kimble of Pitchfork Media stated, "The motivated, slightly weary Ross heard on Black Market—which has no MMG features—is a better fit for the moment than the bulletproof supervillain of old. Ross has proven his resilience in the past; maybe carefully controlled doses of reality are just what he needs to move forward."

Commercial performance
In the United States, the album debuted at number 6 on the Billboard 200, with 65,000 album-equivalent units (54,000 copies of pure sales) in its first week.

Track listing

Notes
  signifies a co-producer
  signifies an additional producer
 "Silk Road" features additional vocals from Teedra Moses.
 "Peace Sign" features additional vocals from Red Café and Jeremih.
 "Foreclosures" features additional vocals from Kenneth Bartolomei.

Charts

Weekly charts

Year-end charts

References

2015 albums
Albums produced by Jake One
Albums produced by J. R. Rotem
Albums produced by Scott Storch
Def Jam Recordings albums
Maybach Music Group albums
Rick Ross albums